Peoda village is located in Kaithal Tehsil of Kaithal district in Haryana, India. As per constitution of India and Panchyati Raaj Act, Peoda village is administrated by Sarpanch (Head of Village) who is elected representative of village.

Demographics
Most of the population of the village is Hindu and widely spoken language is Haryanvi.

Schools
 Govt. Sr. Secondary Sechool.
 Govt. Primary school

Transportation
The nearby Railway stations to Peoda village are New Kaithal Halt Railway station (NKLE) and Kaithal Railway station (KLE).

From Kaithal bus stand, bus services are also available to Delhi, Hisar, Chandigarh, Jammu and many other places.

References 

Villages in Kaithal district